Jennifer Elaine "Jenny" Stoute (born 16 April 1965) is female English former sprinter. She represented Great Britain at the 1988 Olympic Games in Seoul and the 1992 Olympic Games in Barcelona, where she won a bronze medal in the 4x400 metres relay. She also appeared as Rebel in the ITV show Gladiators from 1996 to 1999.

Biography
Stoute was born in Bradford, West Yorkshire, England to Barbadian parents. She first came to international attention, when she reached the 200 metres final representing England at the 1986 Commonwealth Games in 1986 Commonwealth Games in Edinburgh, Scotland, where she pulled up injured and failed to finish. In 1988, at the Olympic Games, she was a member of the British 4 × 400 m relay quartet that finished sixth in the final. In 1989, she finished fourth in the 200 metres final at the European Indoor Championships.

In January 1990, representing England at the 1990 Commonwealth Games in Auckland, New Zealand, Stoute was fourth in the 200 metres final, just one one-hundredth of a second behind bronze medalist Pauline Davis. She also finished fifth in the 400 metres final before winning two relay medals, silver in the 4 × 100 m and gold in the 4 × 400 m, along with Angela Piggford, Linda Keough and Sally Gunnell. At the 1990 European Championships in Split she won a bronze medal in the 4 × 400 m relay, along with Pat Beckford, Keough and Gunnell. At the 1991 World Championships, she again succumbed to injury pulling up in her 200m quarter-final and forcing her out of the relay.

The peak of Stoute's career came in 1992, at the Barcelona Olympics, where she ran her lifetime best in the 200 metres of 22.73 secs to reach the semi-finals, before going on to earn a bronze medal in the 4 × 400 m relay along with Phylis Smith, Sandra Douglas and Sally Gunnell. She competed at the 1993 World Championships, where she reached the quarter-finals of the 200 metres. After two years struggling with injuries, she finished fifth in the 200 metres at the 1996 British Olympic trials in Birmingham, failing to earn selection. Her final major Competition was the 1997 World Indoor Championships.

From 1996 - 1999 she appeared as "Rebel" in the TV show Gladiators. She also returned for the 2008 revival and appeared in two Legend specials.

Stoute has two daughters, both born in Bromley, Greater London: Alicia Jazmin (born 2001) and Renee Stefani (born 2005).

References

External links
 
 
 

1965 births
Living people
Athletes (track and field) at the 1988 Summer Olympics
Athletes (track and field) at the 1990 Commonwealth Games
Athletes (track and field) at the 1992 Summer Olympics
Commonwealth Games gold medallists for England
Commonwealth Games medallists in athletics
English female sprinters
Olympic athletes of Great Britain
Olympic bronze medallists for Great Britain
Sportspeople from Bradford
Gladiators (1992 British TV series)
European Athletics Championships medalists
Black British sportswomen
English people of Barbadian descent
Medalists at the 1992 Summer Olympics
Olympic bronze medalists in athletics (track and field)
Olympic female sprinters
Medallists at the 1990 Commonwealth Games